447 Luna Tower is a residential development under construction in Colombo, Sri Lanka. At 44 storeys, the building will be one of the most recognizable buildings in Union Place, Colombo.This residential development is soon to be seen among the residential giants of the Colombo cityscape, accompanied by 202 luxury living spaces spanned over 44 stories. 447 Luna Tower is a perfect blend of elegance and design. The unique green concept makes it the only residential development in Colombo to feature a distinctive green wall and plant troughs within the premises. The building is situated on a land located at Union Place, Colombo 002. Ground breaking started in 2016.

447 Luna Tower's superstructure was completed in August 2019, the handover will commence in 2021.

Apartment Features 
Additionally, the development will also have a rooftop infinity pool which gives a panoramic view of the Colombo city with the Beira lake and the Indian ocean. The residential development offers a range of exclusive amenities such as a Clubhouse, Gymnasium, Kids' play area, Lounge, and a Garden terrace, which is located on the seventh floor and spans around the tower.

Finishes and Fittings 
The premium finishes of the apartments at 447 Luna Tower stand out, with Burmese teak floors, Italian Marazzi tiling, and Hansgrohe and Duravit luxury sanitary ware to elevate your living experience. It has certainly set a standard in terms of quality and design, utilizing porcelain tiles, German SEA pantries, and Häfele kitchenware.

Developer 
Belluna Co. Ltd is a Japanese company that is traded on the Tokyo Stock Exchange. It has a diverse portfolio, with main assets in the real estate sector spanning the globe from Myanmar to the United States, including Hollywood and Los Angeles projects.

Construction partner 
Sanken Construction has been at the forefront of construction innovation for over 30 years, having completed several residential, hotel, and business projects in Sri Lanka and abroad. Sanken is known for its efficient use of outstanding resources and reliable service that follows industry best practices.

Architect 
PWA is a leading architectural and design firm in Sri Lanka, with a diverse portfolio of projects ranging from small residences to high-end hotels and even monumental structures. Vertical living in a physically appealing and functionally efficient facility is Philip Weeraratne's vision for 447 Luna Tower.

Sales and Marketing partner 
Acquest (Private) Limited is Sri Lanka's leading real estate services provider, with unmatched market information and over a decade of experience in brokerage, development advisory, and project sales and marketing.

References

External links
 Official site

Buildings and structures in Colombo
Residential skyscrapers in Sri Lanka
Apartment buildings in Colombo